Alfonso Durazo Montaño (born 11 July 1954) is a Mexican politician who served as chief spokesman and private secretary of President Vicente Fox. Representing the National Regeneration Movement (MORENA), he is the current Governor of Sonora.

Early life and education
Durazo was born in Bavispe, Sonora, on 11 July 1954. For elementary school, he went to the General Miguel Samaniego school. For middle school, he went to the General Plutarco Elías Calles school in Agua Prieta, Sonora. For high school he attended Instituto Soria in Hermosillo, Sonora. He holds a bachelor's degree in civil engineering from the National Autonomous University of Mexico, a bachelor's degree in law from the Metropolitan Autonomous University, a master's degree in public administration from the Sonoran Institute of Public Administration, AC, and a doctorate's degree in public policy from the Monterrey Institute of Technology and Higher Education.

Career
From 1992 to 1993 he served as private secretary of the Secretary of Social Development Luis Donaldo Colosio. When Colosio became the PRI candidate to the presidency of Mexico, Durazo continued to serve as Colosio's private secretary.

In May 2000 he resigned from the PRI and joined the presidential campaign of Vicente Fox. Fox appointed Durazo as his private secretary after the July 2000 election and also became the presidential spokesman in 2003. Durazo resigned from his positions in 2004 and heavily criticised Fox's administration.

In March 2006 Durazo announced that he will be joining  Andrés Manuel López Obrador's presidential campaign. On that year he was nominated Candidate for Senator in his home state, Sonora. In January 2012 he joined again López Obrador's presidential campaign as General Manager in the State of Sonora.

 he served as Deputy of the LXII Legislature of the Mexican Congress representing Sonora.

Andrés Manuel López Obrador reestablished the Secretariat of Public Security, previously abolished by the Peña administration, and named Durazo as the head of the agency.

References

External links
 Perfil de Legislador (in Spanish)

1954 births
Living people
Politicians from Sonora
Members of the Chamber of Deputies (Mexico)
Institutional Revolutionary Party politicians
Citizens' Movement (Mexico) politicians
Morena (political party) politicians
21st-century Mexican politicians
National Autonomous University of Mexico alumni
Monterrey Institute of Technology and Higher Education alumni
Universidad Autónoma Metropolitana alumni
Governors of Sonora
Deputies of the LXII Legislature of Mexico